The following elections occurred in the year 1990.

Africa
 1990 Algerian local election
 1990 Chadian parliamentary election
 1990 Comorian presidential election
 1990 Gabonese legislative election
 1990 Ivorian parliamentary election
 1990 Ivorian presidential election
 1990 São Tomé and Príncipe constitutional referendum
 1990 Tanzanian general election
 1990 Togolese parliamentary election
 1990 Zimbabwean parliamentary election
 1990 Zimbabwean presidential election

Asia
 1990 Autonomous Region in Muslim Mindanao general election
 1990 Burmese general election
 1990 Kuwaiti National Council election
 1990 Malaysian general election
 1990 Mongolian legislative election
 1990 North Korean parliamentary election
 1990 Pakistani general election
 1990 Taiwan presidential election

Japan
 1990 Japanese general election

Soviet Union
 1990 Azerbaijani parliamentary election
 1990 Estonian Supreme Soviet election
 1990 Georgian legislative election
 1990 Latvian parliamentary election
 1990 Lithuanian parliamentary election
 1990 Ukrainian parliamentary election

Moldova
 1990 Moldovan parliamentary election

Russia
 1990 Russian legislative election

Australia
 1990 Australian federal election
 1990 Custance state by-election
 1990 Fremantle state by-election
 1990 Northern Territory general election

Europe
 1990 Belgian regional elections
 1990 Bosnian general election
 1990 Bosnia and Herzegovina municipal elections
 1990 Bulgarian parliamentary election
 Congress of Estonia
 1990 Croatian parliamentary election
 1990 Czech legislative election
 1990 Danish parliamentary election
 1990 East German general election
 1990 Faroese parliamentary election
 1990 Georgian legislative election
 1990 Greek legislative election
 1990 Hungarian parliamentary election
 1990 Irish presidential election
 1990 Latvian parliamentary election
 1990 Lithuanian parliamentary election
 1990 Montenegrin municipal election
 1990 Montenegrin parliamentary election
 1990 Montenegrin presidential election
 1990 Polish presidential election
 1990 Romanian presidential election
 1990 Serbian parliamentary election
 1990 Slovak parliamentary election
 1990 Ukrainian parliamentary election
 1990 Venetian regional election

Austria
 1990 Austrian legislative election

Germany
 1990 East German general election
 1990 German federal election

Hungary
 1990 Hungarian parliamentary election (25 March and 8 April 1990)

Soviet Union
 1990 Azerbaijani parliamentary election
 1990 Estonian Supreme Soviet election
 1990 Georgian legislative election
 1990 Latvian parliamentary election
 1990 Ukrainian parliamentary election

Lithuania
 1990 Lithuanian parliamentary election

Moldova
 1990 Moldovan parliamentary election

Russia
 1990 Russian legislative election

Spain
 1990 Basque parliamentary election

United Kingdom
 May 1990 Bootle by-election
 November 1990 Bootle by-election
 1990 Bradford North by-election
 1990 Conservative Party leadership election
 1990 Eastbourne by-election
 1990 Knowsley South by-election
 1990 Paisley North by-election
 1990 Paisley South by-election
 1990 Mid Staffordshire by-election
 1990 Upper Bann by-election

United Kingdom local
 1990 Scottish regional elections
 1990 United Kingdom local elections

English local
 1990 Bristol City Council election
 1990 Lambeth Council election
 1990 Lewisham Council election
 1990 Manchester Council election
 1990 Newham Council election
 1990 Southwark Council election
 1990 Tower Hamlets Council election
 1990 Trafford Council election
 1990 Wolverhampton Council election

North America
 1990 Guatemalan general election
 1990 Nicaraguan general election

Canada
 1990 Liberal Party of Canada leadership election
 1990 Manitoba general election
 1990 Ontario general election

Caribbean
 1990–1991 Haitian general election

United States
 1990 United States Senate elections
 1990 United States gubernatorial elections

United States mayoral
 1990 New Orleans mayoral election
 1990 Washington, D.C. mayoral election

United States gubernatorial
 1990 United States gubernatorial elections
 1990 Alabama gubernatorial election
 1990 Alaska gubernatorial election
 1990 California gubernatorial election
 1990 Connecticut gubernatorial election
 1990 Idaho gubernatorial election
 1990 Kansas gubernatorial election
 1990 Maine gubernatorial election
 1990 Michigan gubernatorial election
 1990 Minnesota gubernatorial election
 1990 New York gubernatorial election
 1990 Oklahoma gubernatorial election
 1990 Oregon gubernatorial election
 1990 South Carolina gubernatorial election

Alabama
 1990 Alabama gubernatorial election

Alaska
 1990 Alaska gubernatorial election

Arkansas
 United States Senate election in Arkansas, 1990

California
 1990 California State Senate elections
 1990 California gubernatorial election
 United States House of Representatives elections in California, 1990

Connecticut
 1990 Connecticut gubernatorial election

Georgia (U.S. state)
 1990 Georgia gubernatorial election
 United States Senate election in Georgia, 1990

Hawaii
 United States Senate special election in Hawaii, 1990

Idaho
 1990 Idaho gubernatorial election

Illinois
 United States Senate election in Illinois, 1990

Indiana
 United States Senate special election in Indiana, 1990

Iowa
 United States Senate election in Iowa, 1990

Kansas
 1990 Kansas gubernatorial election
 United States Senate election in Kansas, 1990

Kentucky
 United States Senate election in Kentucky, 1990

Louisiana
 1990 New Orleans mayoral election

Maine
 1990 Maine gubernatorial election

Massachusetts
 1990 Massachusetts general election
 1990 Massachusetts gubernatorial election
 United States Senate election in Massachusetts, 1990

Michigan
 1990 Michigan gubernatorial election

Minnesota
 1990 Minnesota gubernatorial election

Mississippi
 United States Senate election in Mississippi, 1990

Nebraska
 United States Senate election in Nebraska, 1990

New Hampshire
 United States Senate election in New Hampshire, 1990

New Jersey
 United States Senate election in New Jersey, 1990

New York
 1990 New York gubernatorial election

North Carolina
 United States Senate election in North Carolina, 1990

Oklahoma
 1990 Oklahoma gubernatorial election

Oregon
 Oregon Ballot Measure 5 (1990)
 1990 Oregon gubernatorial election

Rhode Island
 United States Senate election in Rhode Island, 1990

South Carolina
 1990 South Carolina gubernatorial election
 United States House of Representatives elections in South Carolina, 1990

United States House of Representatives
 1990 United States House of Representatives elections
 United States House of Representatives elections in California, 1990
 United States House of Representatives elections in South Carolina, 1990

United States Senate
 1990 United States Senate elections
 United States Senate election in Arkansas, 1990
 United States Senate election in Georgia, 1990
 United States Senate special election in Hawaii, 1990
 United States Senate election in Illinois, 1990
 United States Senate special election in Indiana, 1990
 United States Senate election in Iowa, 1990
 United States Senate election in Kansas, 1990
 United States Senate election in Kentucky, 1990
 United States Senate election in Massachusetts, 1990
 United States Senate election in Mississippi, 1990
 United States Senate election in Nebraska, 1990
 United States Senate election in New Hampshire, 1990
 United States Senate election in New Jersey, 1990
 United States Senate election in North Carolina, 1990
 United States Senate election in Rhode Island, 1990
 United States Senate election in South Carolina, 1990
 United States Senate election in Virginia, 1990

Virginia
 United States Senate election in South Carolina, 1990
 United States Senate election in Virginia, 1990

Washington, D.C.
 1990 Washington, D.C. mayoral election

West Virginia
 United States Senate election in West Virginia, 1990

South America 
 1990 Brazilian legislative election
 Colombia: 
 1990 Colombian Constitutional Assembly election
 1990 Colombian parliamentary election
 1990 Colombian presidential election
 1990 Ecuadorian parliamentary election
 1990 Peruvian general election

Oceania
 1990 New Zealand general election
 1990 Niuean general election
 1990 Tongan general election

Australia
 1990 Australian federal election
 1990 Custance state by-election
 1990 Fremantle state by-election
 1990 Northern Territory general election

Hawaii
 United States Senate special election in Hawaii, 1990

See also

 
1990
Elections